Robleh Ali Adou (born 17 June 1964) is an international windsurfer who competes for Djibouti.

Adou has competed in three Olympic Games, firstly he was at the 1988 Summer Olympics where he competed in the Division II Class, he finished in 40th place overall, four years later he entered the Lechner A-390 Class where this time he finished in 39th place. his final appearance at the Olympics was in the 1996 Summer Olympics in the Mistral One Class, there he finished in 46th place.

References

1964 births
Living people
Olympic sailors of Djibouti
Djiboutian male sailors (sport)
Djiboutian windsurfers
Sailors at the 1988 Summer Olympics – Division II
Sailors at the 1992 Summer Olympics – Lechner A-390
Sailors at the 1996 Summer Olympics – Mistral One Design